"Saturday Night" is a single released in 2002 by the group The Underdog Project. The song is similar to their first hit "Summer Jam" as they both have the whistle in them. The single was also well received in Europe, although it didn't have much airplay in the US or UK.

Track listing
German CD single
 "Saturday Night" (Radio Cut)		
 "Saturday Night" (Seven Gemini Remix)		
 "Saturday Night" (Extended)		
 "Saturday Night" (Alternative Version)		
 "Saturday Night" (Seven Gemini Remix Instrumental)		
 "Saturday Night" (Acappella)

Charts

Weekly charts

Year-end charts

References

2002 singles
The Underdog Project songs
Eurodance songs
2002 songs
PolyGram singles
Songs about nights